El Eco de Tetuan was a hispanophone newspaper printed in Tetuan, Morocco. The first publication was on May 1, 1860, shortly after the Treaty of Wad Ras marked the end of the Hispano-Moroccan War. With the exception of El Liberal Africano first published in Ceuta around 1820, El Eco de Tetuan was the first newspaper in Morocco. It was edited by Pedro Antonio de Alarcón.

References 

Spanish-language newspapers
Defunct newspapers published in Morocco
Spanish North Africa
Tétouan
Publications established in 1860
1860 establishments in Morocco